Deh-e Kharani (also Romanized as Deh-e Kharānī; also known as Kharānī) is a village in Razavar Rural District, in the Central District of Kermanshah County, Kermanshah Province, Iran. At the 2006 census, its population was 184, in 34 families.

References 

Populated places in Kermanshah County